A number of Royal Navy ships have been named Daffodil.

 , a Mersey ferry requisitioned for the Zeebrugge Raid in 1918
  was an  sloop launched in 1915 and sold for breaking up in 1935.
 , former TF3 train ferry converted into a Landing Ship Sternchute (LSS) during World War II and sunk in 1945

Royal Navy ship names